"I Said I'm Sorry" is the first single by Australian rock group, British India, from their second studio album, Thieves, which was issued in June 2008. The song contains "brooding pop melodies" typical of the group's debut album, Guillotine. It was listed at No. 37 on the Triple J Hottest 100, 2008.

Track listing

Release history

References

British India (band) songs
2008 singles
Song recordings produced by Harry Vanda
2008 songs